Aliya Kanani is a Canadian actress and comedian from Toronto, Ontario. She is most noted for her performance as Ms. Hina in the 2021 film Scarborough, for which she received a Canadian Screen Award nomination for Best Actress at the 10th Canadian Screen Awards in 2022.

In 2022, she premiered the one-woman comedy show Where You From, From? at the Toronto Fringe Festival, and appeared in the film Concrete Valley.

References

External links

21st-century Canadian actresses
21st-century Canadian comedians
Canadian film actresses
Canadian television actresses
Canadian stand-up comedians
Canadian women comedians
Canadian Muslims
Actresses from Toronto
Living people
Year of birth missing (living people)